Alash was a political party and liberation movement in the Russian Republic and Socialist Russia, and the ruling party of Alash Autonomy on the territory of present-day Kazakhstan and Russia. They advocated for equal treatment between Kazakhs and Russians and the cessation of Russian settlement on the Kazakh lands. It was notably the first modern organized political Kazakh and Kyrgyz elite group.

Alash party attempted to reinforce Kazakh identity rather than embracing Russian identities. Western secularism and ties to the Muslim world were the major dividing issues among the party intelligentsia and the Kazakh elites, through the Russian Civil War.

Chairman of the party and president of the Alash Autonomy was Alikhan Bokeikhanov. Prior to the formation of Alash party, he and other notable members of the party were members of the liberal Constitutional Democratic Party, which they maintained some relations with.

Alash party ceased to exist on August 26, 1920, after the Bolsheviks defeated White Army that was occupying territory of the Alash Autonomy, and formed the Kirghiz Autonomous Socialist Soviet Republic.

Etymology 
The word "Alash" means tribesman or relative in Turkic languages, but according to some sources, Alash may be used as a synonym to "Kazakh". Qadyrgali Jalaiyr - Kazakh chronicler and politician, often used Alash as the word to replace Kazakh.

The party had plans to unite all Turkic peoples of Central Asia and create an independent state. For that they didn't want Kazakhs to be titular nation, so they decided to choose word Alash, creating a new Turkic identity between nations. However, this plan didn't work out. Kazakh politician Mustafa Shokay commented the first congresses of Alash: "Congress became a symbolic scene to show our unity, by common goal to unite great Turkic peoples".

History

Formation and Existence of Party 
The party was founded by the former Constitutional Democratic Party members, thus making the party one of the successors of the Constitutional Democrats.

After February Revolution, Russia has weakened, and Kazakh elite used the moment to found a party. At all-Kazakh congress in Orenburg from July 21 to 28, 1917, party was organized and main questions were answered such as form of government of Russia, which they decided that Russia should become federal parliamentary republic.

Alash Party was founded in December 1917, the information of founding of party was published on Qazaq journal. Alash won elections in most of regions of Kazakhstan, de facto founding an Alash Autonomy.

Alash during Kazakh ASSR 
Alash party ceased to exist on August 26, 1920, after the Bolsheviks defeated White Army that was occupying territory of the Alash Autonomy, and formed the Kirghiz Autonomous Socialist Soviet Republic. However, Kazakh elite decided to continue working to improve Kazakhstan. Some of former Alash members joined Communist Party of the Soviet Union. 

Former Alash members started translating textbooks for schools. During Asharshylyk, Kazakh elite showed big protest towards Soviet political system, criticizing propaganda and totally ignoration of famine. They wrote two letters to Soviet government. First is "The letter of five" written on July 4, 1932, by Gabit Musirepov, Mansur Gataulin, Embergen Altynbekov, Mutash Dauletkaliev and Kadir Kuanyshev. Second is "The letter to J. V. Stalin", a letter written by Turar Ryskulov to Joseph Stalin.

In the 1930s, most of elite was caught and sent to Gulags for alleged support of nationalistic ideas. Intolerable prison conditions and constant stress in prison made detained age faster, which is shown on last photos of them. In period of 1935-1938 most of Kazakh elite was shot.

Memory 
On July 4, 2021, the leaders of the Alash movement Akhmet Baitursynov, Alikhan Bukeikhanov and Mirzhakip Dulatov were unveiled a monument in Astana.

See also 

Akhmet Baitursynov
Alash Orda
Basmachi movement
Ismail Gasprinski
Jadid
Pan-Turkism

References

Defunct political parties in Kazakhstan
History of Kazakhstan
Political parties of the Russian Revolution
Russian Soviet Federative Socialist Republic
Anti-communist organizations
Political parties disestablished in 1920